The Periyalvar Tirumoli is a Tamil Hindu work of literature penned by Periyalvar, one of the twelve Alvars of Sri Vaishnavism. Composed of 473 verses, it is part of the compendium of hymns called the Naalayira Divya Prabandham, and has been dated back to the 9th century CE.

Hymns 
A hymn of the Periyalvar Tirumoli describes the temple of Srirangam as the home of the Dashavatara, as translated by Vasudha Narayanan:

Periyalvar also extols Krishna's act of lifting the mountain, Govardhana:

See also 

 Kanninun Cirutampu
 Periya Tiruvantati
 Perumal Tirumoli

References 

Naalayira Divya Prabandham

Alvars
Sri Vaishnavism